Padikkal is an Indian surname. Notable people with the surname include:

Devdutt Padikkal (born 2000), Indian cricketer
Jayaram Padikkal (1936–1997), Indian police official

Indian surnames